Rossiya Airlines, a Russian airline, flies to the following destinations (as of March 2022):

References

Lists of airline destinations